Alex Brown is a No.1 bestselling British author and columnist, of eleven books including the hugely popular Carrington's series, The Great Christmas Knit Off, The Great Village Show, The Secret of Orchard Cottage and A Postcard from Italy. Her uplifting books are published worldwide and have been translated into seven languages.

Formerly the City Girl columnist for The London Paper, she signed a three-book deal with HarperCollins publishers to write the Carrington's series of novels. In 2014 she signed a second three-book deal with HarperCollins to write the Tindledale series.

Biography 
Alexandra was born in Brighton and worked in financial services for many years. After leaving the corporate world she won a competition to write the weekly City Girl column for The London Paper.

Alexandra was well known for writing the City Girl column for the London Paper. This role began in 2006 following a competition win. She has also written short stories and articles for a wide range of magazines, including Prima and Cosmopolitan.

She got her first book deal after meeting a HarperCollins editor at a Romantic Novelists' Association party, and they worked together on what was to become the Carrington's series. In 2014, HarperCollins signed her to write a further series of three books set in the fictional village of Tindledale.

Personal life 
Brown lives by the sea in Kent with her husband, daughter and two very glossy black Labradors

Brown says she is superstitious and needs to light a candle before she sits down to write.

Brown says she also enjoys knitting and attending Northern Soul nights and is a passionate supporter of charities working with care leavers and vulnerable members of society

Bibliography

References 

British chick lit writers
Year of birth missing (living people)
People from Brighton
English writers
Living people
English women novelists
British women columnists